Clarence Carr Quinn (September 25, 1881 – August 6, 1946) was a Major League Baseball pitcher.

Sources

Major League Baseball pitchers
Philadelphia Athletics players
Norwich Reds players
New Haven Blues players
Baseball players from Connecticut
1881 births
1946 deaths